Valleys Radio (Welsh: Radio'r Cymoedd) was an Independent Local Radio station broadcasting to the heads of the South Wales Valleys. The broadcast area was covered by two transmitters, 999 kHz from the Aberdare transmitter, and 1116 kHz from the Ebbw Vale transmitter, with the Ebbw Vale signal being the comparatively stronger of the two.

History
Owners Wireless Group were offered FM frequencies for The Heads of the Valleys they wanted to share programming with neighbouring service Swansea Sound and relocate Swansea Sound to a new media centre in Neath. Wireless applied to extend Swansea Sound West as well and applied for a licence to broadcast from transmitters in Carmarthenshire at Llanelli Carmel and Carmarthen. But due to ownership rules the applications were refused by Ofcom. FM transmissions were not initiated in the area.

On 20 March 2009, UTV Radio announced Valleys Radio was to be sold or shut down within the next 4 weeks. On Thursday 30 April 2009 at 10am, Valleys Radio ceased transmitting, after many listener messages, emotional speeches and farewells from radio producers and presenters. The final song aired was "Our last song together" by Neil Sedaka, on the final radio show, which was called Mark Powell @ Breakfast.

Presenters/Producers (over the years) 
These included Gareth Williams, Karen Brown, Bernie Keith, Dafydd Phillips, Steve Powell, Patrick Downes, Tony Peters, Mark Powell, John Curtis, Keri Jones, Simon Hawkins, Jo Price, Dave Bowen, Steve Johnson.

Music 
The station mainly featured a strong variety of current and classic hits. The station also ran an online 'Music Academy'  which allowed listeners to feedback on the music played by the station via the Valleys Radio website.

Sister Stations
Two sister stations, Swansea Sound (Now Greatest Hits Radio South Wales) and The Wave - which broadcast to the Swansea area are still active. Some previous and current presenters from these two stations have broadcast on Valleys Radio.

References

External links
 UTV Radio

Valleys
Defunct radio stations in the United Kingdom
Radio stations established in 1996
1996 establishments in Wales
Radio stations disestablished in 2009
2009 disestablishments in Wales